A Nightingale Sang in Berkeley Square is a 1979 British heist film directed by Ralph Thomas, written by Guy Elmes and starring Richard Jordan, Oliver Tobias and David Niven. It is subtitled "based on one of the biggest robberies in London". The film takes its name from the 1940 published song "A Nightingale Sang in Berkeley Square".

Ralph Thomas later said the film "had quite a superb cast" and "he was really quite fond" of the movie "but I didn't do it as well as I should have done because by the time we started it David was already sick, and so we had to do the best we could as quickly as we could and it didn't come off as I'd hoped. But it was still a fun film and we enjoyed making it."

It was shot at Twickenham Studios and on location around London. The film's sets were designed by the art director Lionel Couch.

Plot summary
Pinky (Jordan) is released from prison and has decided to go straight from now on, but takes a job as a maintenance man at a large bank, which gives him a lot of undue attention from "Ivan the Terrible" (Niven), the local hoodlum. By using Pinky, Ivan hopes to rob the bank, and Pinky starts to like the idea of going back to his old ways.

Cast

 Richard Jordan as Pinky
 Oliver Tobias as Foxy
 David Niven as Ivan
 Elke Sommer as Miss Pelham
 Gloria Grahame as Ma
 Richard Johnson as Inspector Watford
 Michael Angelis as Pealer Bell
 Brian Croucher as Gregory Peck
 Edward Peel as Jack Diamond
 Peter Cartwright as Major Treadwell
 Hugh Griffith as Sid Larkin
 Davy Kaye as Sid the Yid
 John Rhys-Davies as Solicitor
 Robert Raglan as Judge
 Sally Harris as Jill
 Ewen Solon as Commander Ford
 Bruce Boa as Morgan Stanfield
 Elizabeth Adare as Barrister

Also known as
The Big Scam
The Biggest Bank Robbery
The Mayfair Bank Caper (video title)

References

External links 
 
 
Film page at Britmovie
 

1979 films
1970s heist films
British heist films
1970s English-language films
Films directed by Ralph Thomas
Films scored by Stanley Myers
Films set in London
Films shot in London
Films shot at Twickenham Film Studios
1970s British films